In sociology of scientific knowledge, Planck's principle is the view that scientific change does not occur because individual scientists change their mind, but rather that successive generations of scientists have different views.

Formulation 

This was formulated by Max Planck:

Colloquially, this is often paraphrased as "Science progresses one funeral at a time".

Adoption 

Planck's quote has been used by Thomas Kuhn, Paul Feyerabend, Moran Cerf and others to argue that the  that scientific revolutions are non-rational, rather than spreading through "mere force of truth and fact".

Rebuttal 

Whether age influences the readiness to accept new ideas has been empirically criticised. In the case of acceptance of evolution in the years after Darwin's On the Origin of Species, age was a minor factor. On a more specialized scale, it also was a weak factor in accepting cliometrics. A study of when different geologists accepted plate tectonics found that older scientists actually adopted it sooner than younger scientists. However, a more recent study on life science researchers found that following the deaths of preeminent researchers, publications by their collaborators rapidly declined while the activity of non-collaborators and the number of new researchers entering their field rose.

References

Principle
Concepts in epistemology
Epistemology of science
Historiography of science
Philosophy of science
Principles
Scientific revolution
Sociology of scientific knowledge
Cognitive inertia